Bastardia elegans is a species of flowering plants in the mallow family, Malvaceae. It is found in Brazil.

References

External links 

 Bastardia elegans at The Plant List
 Bastardia elegans at Tropicos

Malveae
Plants described in 1891
Flora of Brazil